The church of the Santissima Trinità dei Monti, often called merely the Trinità dei Monti (French: La Trinité-des-Monts), is a Roman Catholic late Renaissance titular church in Rome, central Italy. It is best known for its position above the Spanish Steps which lead down to the famous Piazza di Spagna. The church and its surrounding area (including the Villa Medici) are a French State property.

History

In 1494, Saint Francis of Paola, a hermit from Calabria, bought a vineyard from the papal scholar and former patriarch of Aquileia, Ermolao Barbaro, and then obtained the authorization from Pope Alexander VI to establish a monastery for the Minimite Friars. In 1502, Louis XII of France began construction of the church of the Trinità dei Monti next to this monastery, to celebrate his successful invasion of Naples. Building work began in a French style with pointed late Gothic arches, but construction lagged.

The present Italian Renaissance church was eventually built in its place and finally consecrated in 1585 by the great urbanizer Pope Sixtus V, whose via Sistina connected the Piazza della Trinità dei Monti (outside the church) to the Piazza Barberini across the city. The architect of the facade is not known for certain, but Wolfgang Lotz suggests that it may have originated in a design by Giacomo della Porta (a follower of Michelangelo), who had built the church of Sant'Atanasio dei Greci, which has similarities, a little earlier. The double staircase in front of the church was by Domenico Fontana.

In front of the church stands the Obelisco Sallustiano, one of the many obelisks in Rome, moved here in 1789. It is a Roman obelisk in imitation of Egyptian ones, originally constructed in the early years of the Roman Empire for the Gardens of Sallust near the Porta Salaria. The hieroglyphic inscription was copied from that on the obelisk in the Piazza del Popolo known as Flaminio Obelisk.

During the Napoleonic occupation of Rome, the church, like many others, was despoiled of its art and decorations. In 1816, after the Bourbon restoration, the church was restored at the expense of Louis XVIII.

The inscriptions found in Santissima Trinità dei Monti, a valuable source illustrating the history of the church, have been collected and published by Vincenzo Forcella.

Interior
In the first chapel to the right is a Baptism of Christ and other scenes of the life of John the Baptist by the Florentine Mannerist painter Giambattista Naldini. In the third chapel on the right is an Assumption of the Virgin by a pupil of Michelangelo, Daniele da Volterra (the last figure on the right is said to be a portrait of Michelangelo). In the fourth chapel, the Cappella Orsini, are scenes of the Passion of Christ by Paris Nogari and the funeral monument of Cardinal Rodolfo Pio da Carpi by Leonardo Sormani. In a chapel near the high altar is a canvas of the Crucifixion painted by Cesare Nebbia.

In the Cappella Pucci, on the left, are frescoes (1537) by Perino del Vaga finished by Federico and Taddeo Zuccari in 1589. The second chapel on the left has a well-known canvas of the Deposition in grisaille, by Daniele da Volterra, which imitates in trompe-l'œil a work of sculpture; flanking it are frescoes by Pablo de Céspedes and Cesare Arbasia.  The first chapel on the left has frescoes by Nebbia. In the sacristy anteroom are more frescoes by Taddeo Zuccari: a Coronation of the Virgin, an Annunciation, and a Visitation.

In a niche along a corridor that opens onto the cloister, is the fresco (reputed to be miraculous) of the Mater Admirabilis, depicting the Virgin Mary, painted by Pauline Perdreau, a young French girl, in 1844.

Convent
The refectory has a frescoed ceiling by Andrea Pozzo. In the cloister there is an astrolabes table, and along a corridor are the anamorphic frescoes (steeply sloping perspectives that have to be viewed from a particular point to make pictorial sense),  portraying St John on Patmos and St Francis of Paola as a hermit all by Emmanuel Maignan (1637). An upper room was painted with ruins by Charles-Louis Clérisseau.

Religious affiliations
The kings of France remained patrons of the church until the French Revolution and the church continued to be the church of the Minimite Friars until its partial destruction in 1798.

It has been a titular church since the Titulus Santissimae Trinitatis in Monte Pincio was established by Pope Sixtus V in 1587 and has been held ever since by a French Cardinal. The current (2010) Cardinal Priest is Philippe Barbarin, Archbishop of Lyon and Primate of the Gauls.

By the Diplomatic Conventions of 14 May and 8 September 1828 between the Holy See and the Government of France the church and monastery were entrusted to the 'Religieuses du Sacré-Coeur de Jésus' (Society of the Sacred Heart), a French religious order, for the purpose of educating young girls.
 
In 2003 the French government were proposing to make funds available for necessary work on the church but was concerned that the Society might find it difficult to continue their work there in the future and in March 2003 the Society decided that it would withdraw from the Trinità no later than the summer of 2006. On July 12, 2005, the Vatican and the French Embassy to the Holy See announced that the Church, Convent and school would be entrusted from 1 September 2006 to the Monastic Fraternities of Jerusalem.

See also
 Jean-Marie Villot

References

Additional sources 
 
 Hutton, Edward:  Rome (1911. 7th revised & enlarged edn:1950)
 Lotz, Wolfgang:  Architecture in Italy 1500–1600. (1974. Yale U.P.edition 1995)
 Macadam, Alta: Rome  (Blue Guides. 6th edition. London. 1998)

External links

More pictures of the church from RomeArtLover.it
Gabriel Chow, GCatholic.org, Cardinal Protectors of Santissima Trinità al Monte Pincio

Titular churches
Renaissance architecture in Rome
Religious buildings and structures completed in 1585
19th-century Roman Catholic church buildings in Italy
National churches in Rome
Rome R. IV Campo Marzio
Carlo Maderno buildings